Mindrevolutions is the eighth studio album by Swedish progressive rock band Kaipa. It is the band's last album to feature Roine Stolt on guitar. This album also contains Kaipa's longest composition, the title track, clocking in at almost 26 minutes.

Track listing
All songs by Hans Lundin.
All lyrics by Hans Lundin and Roine Stolt except where noted.

Personnel
Hans Lundin - keyboards, vocals
Roine Stolt - guitars
Morgan Ågren - drums
Aleena Gibson - vocals
Patrik Lundström - vocals
Jonas Reingold - bass guitar

External links

2005 albums
Kaipa albums
Inside Out Music albums